František Emmert (born 1974) is author of books about modern European and Czech history.

Biography 
František Emmert was born in 1974 in Brno (Czech Republic) into the family of František Gregor Emmert, a music composer and professor at the Janáček Academy of Music and Performing Arts. His father's family came from the town of Weiden in Bavaria, and his mother's family from Teplice in Bohemia. His paternal ancestors worked for generations as glass makers on the German side of the Šumava Mountains (Bohemian Forest). His mother came from a family of traders who owned a family confectioner's shop in Teplice before 1948.

After graduating from high school, František Emmert studied history and religious studies at the Faculty of Arts of Masaryk University in Brno. In 2011 he obtained the title Doctor of law at the Faculty of Law of Charles University in Prague.

From 1992-2006 he worked as a journalist, broadcaster and book editor. He passed through Czech Radio, the newspapers Rovnost, Právo and ZNnoviny/Slovo and Czech News Agency. From 2009-2011 he worked as a spokesperson for the Supreme Administrative Court in Brno.

He started writing books in 2001. His first two works of fiction were published in 2003 and 2004, and he then started writing non-fiction works about modern European and Czech history. In 2005 the Vyšehrad publishing house published his first non-fiction book, Czechs in the Wehrmacht, which was soon reprinted.

Many narrative publications followed - called museums in a book - that discuss the key events of the 20th century, focusing mainly on European and Czech history. These publications in large format differ from classical books due to their more elaborate graphic design and legibility of the texts. They contain a large number of photographs, and separately printed appendices - facsimiles of archival material and DVDs with contemporary radio broadcasts.
They are used as teaching aids in schools. As of 2012, Emmert has released nine books of this sort, some of which have been reprinted, won awards or been translated into English (The Holocaust). The publication Fateful Eights in Our History was awarded the E. E. Kisch Prize by the Association of Writers in 2009.
   
Emmert is an author of thirty books (2018), including technical legal literature. He is the co-author of a high school textbook on social science and an author of commentaries and journalistic contributions in the daily press and expert articles and studies in the domains of history, law and international politics in technical papers and in collections. He contributed as an expert adviser on the preparation of the 2011 Czech historical film Lidice.

Books 
 2021 - Havel.
 2021 - Czechs in the German Wehrmacht. In German.
 2020 - Het Oostfront 1941-1945. In Dutch. 
 2020 - US Army in Czechoslovakia.
 2019 - De Wehrmacht in de jaren 1935-1945. In Dutch.
 2019 - De Holocaust. In Dutch.   
 2019 - Modern Czech History.
 2019 - Velvet Revolution. The Road to Freedom.
 2018 - The Czechoslovak Legion in Russia.
 2018 - The Birth of the Czechoslovak Republic: The National Revolution of 1918.
 2018 - Breakthrough eights 1918-1938-1948-1968.
 2017 - T. G. Masaryk: Thinker and President.
 2017 - The Wehrmacht: A German Soldier’s Service.
 2016 - Zikmund and Hanzelka: Around the World in a Tatra Car. Bestseller. 
 2016 - The German Occupation of the Czech Lands.
 2016 - Citizenship in the Czech Republic in the Past and the Present. Technical monograph.  Legal literature (history of law).
 2015 - Mobilization in 1938: We Wanted to Defend Ourselves!
 2015 - The Czechoslovak Resistance during the Second World War.
 2014 - Czechoslovak Legionaries during the First World War.
 2014 - TGM. 2nd edition 2020.
 2013 - The Eastern Front.
 2012 - Guidebook to Czech History of the 20th Century. 2nd edition 2019. 
 2012 - Vaclav Havel 1936-2011. Museum in a book.
 2012 - The Czechoslovak Foreign Resistance Movement in the West in World War II. Museum in a book.
 2011 - The Czech Republic and Dual Nationality. Technical monograph.  Legal literature (history of law). 2nd edition 2014.
 2009 - The Velvet Revolution. The Chronicle of the Fall of Communism 1989. Museum in a book.
 2008 - Fateful Eights in Our History. Bestseller from the "museums in a book" series. The book won the E. E. Kisch Award in 2009.
 2008 - 1918 The Creation of the Czechoslovak Republic. Museum in a book.
 2008 - The assassination of Heydrich. Museum in a book. 2nd edition 2016.
 2008 - The Czechs at Tobruk. 2nd edition 2014. 
 2007 - The Year 1968 in Czechoslovakia. Museum in a book. 2nd edition 2017. 
 2007 - The Second World War. Czechs and Slovaks. Museum in a book.
 2006 - The Holocaust. Museum in a book. Bestseller. In English version 2007. 2nd edition in Czech version 2018. 
 2005 - Czechs in the Wehrmacht. Bestseller. 2nd edition 2013. 3nd edition 2014. 
 2004 - The Millennium of False Prophets. Adventure novella.
 2003 - Graduate! in social science. School textbook.
 2003 - The Fire of Forgotten Gods. Adventure novella. American edition in English version 2006. 2nd edition in Czech version 2013.

Books in English 

 2006 - The Holocaust was the first publication in the Museums in a Book series. It maps the persecution and extermination of European Jews by the Nazi regime. It contains removable facsimiles. The book won multiple awards and was published in English in 2007. 
 2003 - The Fire of Forgotten Gods was an adventure novel, translated into English and also published in printed and electronic form in the USA (2006).

Awards 
 2010 - E. E. Kisch Prize awarded by the Association of Writers for the book The Velvet Revolution. The Chronicle of the Fall of Communism 1989.
 2009 - E. E. Kisch Grand Prize awarded by the Association of Writers for the book Fateful Eights in Our History.
 2008 - The Prize of the 17th Fall Book Trade Fair in Havlíčkův Brod awarded to the book The Second World War. Czechs and Slovaks.
 2007 - The Prize of the 18th Fall Book Trade Fair in Havlíčkův Brod awarded to the book The Holocaust.

References

External links
 Databases of the National Library CZ (in English)
 Official website of writer František Emmert (in English)
 Details about his book The Holocaust (in English)

1974 births
Czech male writers
Living people
Writers from Brno
Charles University alumni
Masaryk University alumni
Czech journalists